"Black Mirror" is the first single by Canadian indie rock band Arcade Fire in the US from their second album Neon Bible (while "Keep the Car Running" is the first in the UK).

The single was first announced by the band on January 19, 2007 and was streamed on their official website under "Win's Scrapbook". It was released three days later on January 22 under Merge Records.

A music video, starring Mathieu Samaille, for Black Mirror was made by Olivier Groulx and Tracy Maurice, who is also responsible for the art direction on Neon Bible and Funeral. The interactive version, which allows the viewer to trigger instruments on or off, is the work of Vincent Morisset.

References

Arcade Fire songs
2007 singles
2007 songs
Merge Records singles
Songs written by William Butler (musician)
Songs written by Win Butler
Songs written by Régine Chassagne
Songs written by Jeremy Gara
Songs written by Tim Kingsbury
Songs written by Richard Reed Parry